Matías Santiago Sánchez (born 5 July 1996) is an Argentine professional footballer who plays as a midfielder for Mitre.

Career

Club
Sánchez began his senior career with Chacarita Juniors. He made his professional debut on 21 March 2012 in a Copa Argentina match against Gimnasia y Esgrima. He featured once in Primera B Metropolitana in 2012–13 before not playing for the first-team again until February 2015. He had a loan spell with River Plate in 2014. After returning to Charcarita, he scored his first professional goal in a 3–2 defeat to Estudiantes in November 2015. In total, Sánchez made sixteen appearances and scored once for Chacarita by the end of 2015. In January 2016, Sánchez completed a two-season loan move to Lanús.

He failed to feature until midway through the 2016–17 season, during which he made seven appearances and scored one goal.

International
Sánchez played eleven times and scored four goals for the Argentina U17s. He scored two goals in five games at the 2013 South American Under-17 Football Championship as Argentina won the tournament, while he also scored twice in six matches during the 2013 FIFA U-17 World Cup in the United Arab Emirates as Argentina placed 4th. He also won two caps for the U20 team at the 2014 L'Alcúdia International Football Tournament.

Career statistics
.

Honours
Argentina U17
South American Under-17 Football Championship: 2013

References

External links

1996 births
Living people
People from San Martín, Buenos Aires
Argentine footballers
Argentina youth international footballers
Argentina under-20 international footballers
Association football midfielders
Primera Nacional players
Primera B Metropolitana players
Argentine Primera División players
Chacarita Juniors footballers
Club Atlético River Plate footballers
Club Atlético Lanús footballers
Club Atlético Paraná players
Club Atlético Mitre footballers
Sportspeople from Buenos Aires Province